Cichlasoma bimaculatum is an omnivorous, freshwater, tropical fish commonly referred to as the black acara or two-spot cichlid.  It is most frequently classified in the Cichlidae (Cichlid) family and subfamily of Cichlasomatinae.  It is found in freshwater canals and swamps, with a natural region spanning from the Amazon River to northeastern and northern South America.  Since the 1960s it has been identified in the Gulf of Mexico ecosystem in several counties of Florida as far north as Jacksonville.

References

Cichlasoma
Cichlid fish of Central America
Cichlid fish of North America
Cichlid fish of South America
Fish described in 1758
Taxa named by Carl Linnaeus